Zavia Sports Club, commonly known as Zavia, is a Sri Lankan football club based in Dharga Town, Sri Lanka. The club was founded in 1973 by M.M. Ismail and his brothers, as a sports club in Dharga Town.

References 

Football clubs in Sri Lanka
1973 establishments in Sri Lanka